Wilfredo Rivera may refer to:
 Wilfredo Rivera (boxer)
 Wilfredo Rivera (footballer)